Liezel Huber and Lisa Raymond were the defending champions, but decided not to defend their title together. Huber partnered up with Nuria Llagostera Vives, while Raymond played alongside Flavia Pennetta.  Huber and Llagostera Vives defeated Pennetta and Raymond in the first round, but lost to Anabel Medina Garrigues and Katarina Srebotnik in the semifinals.
Sania Mirza and Zheng Jie won the title, defeating Medina Garrigues and Srebotnik in the final, 6–3, 6–4.

Seeds

Draw

Draw

References
 

New Haven Open at Yale - Doubles
Doubles